Lynne M. Jewell (born November 26, 1959, in Burbank, California) is an American sailor and Olympic champion.

Jewell attended Boston University and while there participated in competitive yachting. She was the Yachtswoman of the Year of the New York Yacht Club in 1980, the champion of the International Yacht Racing Union in 1980 and 1984, and the Rolex Yachtswoman of the Year in 1980 and 1988. In 1983, Jewel was the U. S. Singlehanded National Champion. She won a gold medal in the 470 Class at the 1988 Summer Olympics in Seoul, together with Allison Jolly.

Jewell earned her bachelor's degree in 1981 and continued with a master's degree in science and education from Northeastern University in Boston. She married Bill Shore and in 1985 moved to Rhode Island. After attending Rhode Island School of Design, Shore became an interior designer. She was inducted into the Rhode Island Heritage Hall of Fame in 2004.

References

External links

1959 births
American female sailors (sport)
Living people
Olympic gold medalists for the United States in sailing
Sailors at the 1988 Summer Olympics – 470
Snipe class sailors
US Sailor of the Year
Medalists at the 1988 Summer Olympics
Boston University Terriers sailors
Rhode Island School of Design alumni
21st-century American women